The Honda H100S is a two-stroke motorcycle introduced in June 1983, alongside the original Honda H100-A, which was released to the UK in February 1980.
The H100-A was built for fulfilling the role of an economical, practical, lightweight commuter machine. It was designed for riders who preferred the simplicity of the two-stroke engine. In Honda style, equipment such as a fully enclosed chain, capacitor discharge electronic ignition (CDI), and a separate oil injection system allowed easy operation of the motorcycle with the minimum of maintenance and attention.
The lowly-tuned engine gives adequate performance for use in normal traffic conditions, but does not consume high amounts of fuel. Under normal operating conditions, mileage to the gallon figures regularly exceed 80, often close to 100, impressive for a two-stroke and not far off Honda's own four-stroke commuting machines.
The engine uses a reed-valve induction system, and the vibration inherent in single cylinder engines is largely cancelled out by the single shaft primary balancer.

The H100-S was introduced alongside the H100-A which continued in production until stocks were exhausted. The H100-S is a heavily revised version of the original, losing some of its more practical features as a result. This was felt necessary to give it a wider appeal. 
The oil tank was moved from being part of the fuel tank to behind the right hand side panel, the final drive chain casing was relieved for a sleeker, chrome plated top cover, the clocks were made separate from the headlight to allow for a new tachometer, and, strangely, the CDI ignition system was replaced by a contact breaker system (points).

March 1986 saw a largely cosmetic reworking of the H100-S, to form the H100-SII. This model received bolted-on frame down tubes which gave the appearance of a conventional cradle-frame motorcycle. The ignition system was reverted to CDI, and all other changes were in terms of paint and graphics.

Production of the H100-SII ended in 1992, it is very rare to see these in use or for display in the modern day, AKA 2020.

H100
Motorcycles introduced in 1983
Standard motorcycles
Two-stroke motorcycles